Pavel Sergeevich Trikhichev (born November 7, 1992) is a Russian World Cup alpine ski racer. He competed in the 2014 Winter Olympics in Sochi, and in three World Championships.

World Cup results

Season standings

Race podiums
 0 wins
 1 podium – (1 SC)

World Championships results

Olympic results

References

External links 
 
 Pavel Trikhichev World Cup standings at the International Ski Federation 
 
 
 

1992 births
Living people
People from Monchegorsk
Russian male alpine skiers
Olympic alpine skiers of Russia
Alpine skiers at the 2014 Winter Olympics
Alpine skiers at the 2018 Winter Olympics
Sportspeople from Murmansk Oblast